The Bristol and Exeter Railway 0-6-0 locomotives include three different types of broad gauge and standard gauge  steam locomotives designed for working freight trains. On 1 January 1876 the Bristol and Exeter Railway was amalgamated with the Great Western Railway, after which the locomotives were given new numbers.

Broad gauge locomotives

16 inch

Twelve goods locomotives, similar to the GWR Pyracmon Class, built by the Stothert and Slaughter in 1849 and 1853. The last one was withdrawn in 1885.

 21 (1849–1884) GWR No. 2065
 22 (1849–1883) GWR No. 2066
 23 (1849–1885) GWR No. 2067
 24 (1849–1884) GWR No. 2068
 25 (1849–1884) GWR No. 2069
 26 (1849–1887) GWR No. 2070
 27 (1849–1883) GWR No. 2071
 28 (1849–1876) GWR No. 2072
 35 (1853–1876) GWR No. 2073
 36 (1853–1877) GWR No. 2074
 37 (1853–1884) GWR No. 2075
 38 (1853–1880) GWR No. 2076

17 inch

Four locomotives built in 1856 by Stothert and Slaughter and two more in 1860 by Rothwell and Company. The last one survived until 1890.

 53 (1856–1885) GWR No. 2059
 54 (1856–1888) GWR No. 2060
 55 (1856–1884) GWR No. 2061
 56 (1856–1890) GWR No. 2062
 59 (1860–1887) GWR No. 2063
 60 (1860–1884) GWR No. 2064

Standard gauge locomotives

Worcester Engine Company
These  locomotives were built by the Worcester Engine Company in 1867. Five of these six were converted to run on the broad gauge and then reconverted later to standard gauge.
 77
 78
 79
 80
 81
 82

Sharp Stewart
Ten  locomotives built by Sharp Stewart and Company in 1875.

 116
 117
 118
 119
 120
 121
 122
 123
 124
 125

See also
 GWR Swindon Class – 14 locomotives bought by the Bristol and Exeter Railway in 1872

References
 

 

Broad gauge (7 feet) railway locomotives
0-6-0 locomotives
Bristol and Exeter Railway locomotives
Avonside locomotives
Sharp Stewart locomotives
Railway locomotives introduced in 1849
Scrapped locomotives